The Odessa Group of exiled and dissident artists take their name from the Ukrainian city of Odessa.

They are:

Andrey Antoniuk  (1943 – 2013)
Alexander Anufriev 
Valery Basanietz 
Valentin Khrushch (1943 – 2005)
Michail Kowalski 
Ruslan Makoev 
Viktor Mariniuk
Volodymyr Naumez 
Nikolay Novikov (1936 – 199?)
Evgeni Rakhmanin
Sergey Savchenko
Vitaly Sazonov (1947 – 1986)
Valentin Shapavlenko 
Oleg Sokolov (1919 – 1990)
Nikolai Stepanov (1937 – 2003)
Alexander Stovbur (1943 – 2019)
Vladimir Strelnikov
Stanislav Sychov (1937 – 2003)
Vladimir Tzupko 
Alexander Voloshinov 
Ludmilla Yastreb (1945 – 1980)
Yuri Yegorov (1926 – 2008)
Vasiliy Sad

External links
The Group's website

Ukrainian artists
European artist groups and collectives